The 1860 United States presidential election in Ohio took place on November 6, 1860, as part of the 1860 United States presidential election. Ohio voters chose 23 representatives, or electors, to the Electoral College, who voted for president and vice president.

Ohio was won by Illinois Representative Abraham Lincoln (R–Kentucky), running with Senator Hannibal Hamlin, with 51.24% of the popular vote, against Senator Stephen A. Douglas (D–Vermont), running with 41st Governor of Georgia Herschel V. Johnson, with 43.30% of the popular vote.

Liberty Party (under the name Union Party) candidate Gerrit Smith received 136 of his 171 popular votes in Ohio alone. The other 35 votes came from Illinois.

The 1860 presidential election in Ohio began a streak in which no Republican candidate won the election without carrying the state.

Results

Results by county

See also
 United States presidential elections in Ohio

References

Ohio
1860
1860 Ohio elections